The Men's 3000 metre relay at the 2011 World Junior Short Track Speed Skating Championships will begin on 25 February, and are scheduled to end on 27 February at the Forum Sport Center ice rink.

Results

Top 2 Relays from each heat qualify for Semifinals.

Heat 1

Heat 3

Heat 2

Heat 4

References

2011 World Junior Short Track Speed Skating Championships